Secamone is a genus of plant in family Apocynaceae, first described as a genus in 1810. It is widespread across much of Africa, northern Australia, southern Asia, with numerous species endemic to Madagascar.

Species

formerly included
moved to other genera (Genianthus, Metastelma, Toxocarpus)

of uncertain affinity

References

 
Apocynaceae genera
Taxonomy articles created by Polbot